The Jibboom Street Bridge is a historic metal truss swing bridge located on Jibboom Street in Sacramento, California, crossing the American River in Sacramento County. It was built in 1931. The main swing span is flanked by two Parker through truss spans.

On August 18, 2018, Caltrans announced the indefinite closure of the Jibboom Street Bridge to both vehicles and pedestrians due to a maintenance report that revealed several critical structural elements in poor condition. The swing span was rotated into the open position on August 19 and subsequently locked open, therefore allowing marine traffic to pass through while the bridge was closed and no bridge tender was on duty. The bridge was reopened to a single lane of traffic with the swing span locked closed (not available for marine traffic) in October 2018, but was closed again in November following the discovery of more deficiencies.

The bridge remained closed throughout the winter of 2018-19 for a comprehensive rehabilitation project that addressed the deficiencies as well as engaged in preventive maintenance. The bridge fully reopened to traffic on April 2, 2019, and reopened to marine traffic usage the following day with a swing span opening and a police & fire boat passing through.

References

External links

Bridges in Sacramento County, California
Bridges over the American River
Buildings and structures in Sacramento, California
Road bridges in California
Swing bridges in the United States
Truss bridges in the United States
Bridges completed in 1931
Steel bridges in the United States